Ashibusa sinensis is a moth of the family Cosmopterigidae. It was described Z.W. Zhang and H.H. Li in 2009 and id endemic to China.

References

External links

Moths described in 2009
Moths of Asia
Endemic fauna of China
Cosmopteriginae